Epimesophleps aphridias is a moth in the family Gelechiidae. It was described by Rebel in 1925. It is found in Egypt.

References

Gelechiinae
Moths described in 1925